Henrik Nielsen (born 10 October 1958) is a former Danish professional footballer who played as a striker.

Career
Nielsen started his football career in the Danish 2nd Division, playing for B93. There he was scouted by the coach of AEK Athens at the time, Todor Veselinović, and convinced the club's president Andreas Zafeiropoulos to brought him to AEK in the summer of 1987.

The "Copenhagen doll", as he was nicknamed in Greece, initially resembled his predecessor in the position at AEK, Håkan Sandberg, in terms of appearance. He immediately made impressive appearances with the team and showed excellent scoring ability, scoring goals in every way. As a result of his amazing performance that season, he was the top scorer of the Greek league, with 21 goals, while he was much loved by AEK fans. His best match was a 7–1 win at home against Veria, where he scored 4 times. But the following season everything changed. The new coach of AEK Dušan Bajević showed that he did not trust him that much, as a result of which he sometimes used him as the main option and sometimes left him on the bench. Finally, in December 1988, Bajevic and the president Gidopoulos decided to let him leave the club as they were full at the foregners' positions. It was a decision that certainly caused surprise, however AEK finally won the championship at the end of the season, generally justifying the choices of the team managers.

In the rest of the season he played in the colors of Iraklis and in the summer of 1989 he left Greece. He then played in Fenerbahçe, where he won the President Cup in 1990. He played for B 1903 for a few months. Afterwards he spent 2 seasons with Lille and ended his career in the Danish 2nd Division with the colors of Brøndby in 1992, due to an injury.

Personal life
Henrik Nielsen now lives in Copenhagen with his 5 daughters and wife. They have a successful wine production business.

Honours

AEK Athens
Alpha Ethniki: 1988–89

Fenerbahçe
President Cup: 1990

Individual
Alpha Ethniki top scorer: 1987–88

References

1965 births
Living people
Danish men's footballers
Boldklubben af 1893 players
AEK Athens F.C. players
Iraklis Thessaloniki F.C. players
Fenerbahçe S.K. footballers
Lille OSC players
Brøndby IF players
Danish Superliga players
Super League Greece players
Süper Lig players
Ligue 1 players
Danish expatriate men's footballers
Expatriate footballers in Greece
Expatriate footballers in Turkey
Expatriate footballers in France
Danish expatriate sportspeople in Turkey
Association football forwards